The Córas Iompair Éireann 113 class locomotives were the first mainline diesel locomotives used in Ireland, being built in January 1950 and October 1951 by CIÉ at their Inchicore Works. They were initially numbered 1100–1101 in the steam locomotive number series (and designated class C2a), but were subsequently renumbered B113–B114 in 1957.

History
They were intended for mixed traffic duties, hauling both freight and passenger trains. When they were first introduced, they were used on some of the express passenger duties between Dublin and Cork. However, with the arrival of production diesel locomotives (the 001 and 101 Classes) from 1955, these two locomotives were used more for freight work, mostly in the area around Dublin.

They suffered from a recurring brake fault and following a serious incident in August 1971 when 114 ran away while working a goods train, both locomotives were withdrawn for modifications to be made to their brakes. In fact, 114 was never reinstated and 113 only worked for a few months at the end of 1974 before it too was stored again. Both were then used at Inchicore Works as part of a sound barrier with 101 Class locomotives. B113 was presented to the Ulster Folk and Transport Museum in May 2011, but 114 was not so lucky and was scrapped in March 1995.

Preservation

B113 was preserved by Iarnród Éireann at Inchicore works, Dublin, and received a cosmetic restoration there. It was then transferred to the RPSI's depot in Whitehead, County Antrim and later taken to the Ulster Folk and Transport Museum for static display in January 2012, along with NIR 101 Class No. 102. The two locos are currently incapable of running under their own power, and so NIR 111 class locomotives 112 and 113 provided motive power for the move.

References

External links 
 Eiretrains - Irish Locomotives

Iarnród Éireann locomotives
Bo-Bo locomotives
Railway locomotives introduced in 1950
5 ft 3 in gauge locomotives
Diesel-electric locomotives of Northern Ireland
Diesel-electric locomotives of Ireland